Saving Hope is a Canadian supernatural medical drama television series set in Toronto in the fictional hospital Hope Zion. The series stars Erica Durance and Michael Shanks. The show's premise originated with Malcolm MacRury and Morwyn Brebner, who are both credited as creators and executive producers. Saving Hope aired on CTV for five seasons from June 7, 2012 to August 3, 2017, with the first season airing on NBC.

Plot
The protagonist of the show is Dr. Alex Reid (Erica Durance), a doctor whose fiancé, Dr. Charles Harris (Michael Shanks), is in a coma after a car accident while on his way to their wedding. The show follows the life of Charlie in his comatose state and Alex dealing with her patients, all the while hoping that he will survive. Dr. Reid is the Chief Surgical Resident while Dr. Harris was the Chief of Surgery until his accident.  Dr. Harris recovers at the end of season 1, but in subsequent seasons he continues to be able to see the spirits of comatose and dead patients.

The show also stars Dr. Joel Goran (Daniel Gillies), an orthopedic surgeon and Alex's former lover. Reid also works alongside Dr. Shahir Hamza (Huse Madhavji), a neurosurgeon, Dr. Maggie Lin (Julia Taylor Ross), a third year surgical resident on rotation in the General Surgery department, Dr. Gavin Murphy (Kristopher Turner), a psychiatry resident, Dr. Zachary Miller (Benjamin Ayres), the ER doctor, OR nurse Victor Reis (Salvatore Antonio), Dr. Tom Reycraft (K. C. Collins), Dr. Melanda Tolliver (Glenda Braganza), and Dr. Dawn Bell (Michelle Nolden), a cardiologist, who is Charlie's ex-wife.

Cast and characters

Main
 
 Erica Durance as Dr. Alex Reid: At the start of the series, Chief Surgical Resident and Charlie Harris' fiancée.
 Michael Shanks as Dr. Charles "Charlie" Harris: Chief of Surgery, orthopedic surgeon, and Alex's fiancé.
 Daniel Gillies as Dr. Joel Goran: New orthopedic surgeon at Hope Zion and Alex's on-and-off boyfriend (seasons 1–3).
 Huse Madhavji as Dr. Shahir Hamza: Chief of Neurosurgery, who is highly skilled but socially awkward due to his Asperger syndrome.
 Julia Taylor Ross as Dr. Maggie Lin: A third year surgical resident on rotation in the hospital's General Surgery department and then in the OB-GYN department.
 Kristopher Turner as Dr. Gavin Murphy: A psychiatry resident and Maggie's former boyfriend (seasons 1–2; recurring season 3).
 Wendy Crewson as Dr. Dana Kinney: Chief of Plastic Surgery, who is appointed Interim Chief of Surgery following Charlie's coma (seasons 1 & 4; recurring seasons 2, 3 & 5).
 Benjamin Ayres as Dr. Zach Miller: An ER doctor.
 Glenda Braganza as Dr. Melanda Tolliver: A friend of Alex's and an ICU doctor (seasons 1–3).
 Salvatore Antonio as Victor Reis: An OR nurse and Shahir's former boyfriend (seasons 1 & 2).
 K. C. Collins as Dr. Tom Reycraft: A fourth year surgical resident, who is appointed Chief Surgical Resident in place of Alex (seasons 1 & 2; recurring season 3).
 Joseph Pierre as Jackson Wade: An ICU nurse (seasons 2–5; recurring season 1).
 Michelle Nolden as Dr. Dawn Bell: A cardiologist and Charlie's ex-wife, later chief of staff (seasons 2–5; recurring season 1).
 Stacey Farber as Dr. Sydney Katz: An OB/GYN and later Maggie's girlfriend (season 3; guest seasons 4 & 5).
 Kim Shaw as Dr. Cassie Williams: A book-smart intern learning to apply the applications of medication rather than just reading about them (seasons 4–5).

Recurring
 Conrad Coates as Bryan Travers: The main executive of Hope Zion (seasons 1 & 2).
 Steve Cumyn as Dr. George Baumann: An anesthesiologist (seasons 2–4).
 Mac Fyfe as Dr. James Dey: A psychiatry resident (season 3).
 Max Bennett as Dr. Patrick Curtis: A general surgeon and surgical fellow who filled in for Alex during her maternity leave (season 4).
 Dejan Loyola as Dr. Dev Sekara: A junior resident doctor (seasons 4 & 5).
 Parveen Kaur as Dr. Asha Mirani: A junior resident doctor (season 4).
 Jess Salgueiro as Nurse Carbrera: A nurse (seasons 4 & 5).
 Nicole Underhay as Kristine Fields: A nurse in palliative care who, like Charlie, is a medium (season 4).
 Peter Mooney as Dr. Jeremy Bishop: A general surgeon and who has a past with Charlie (seasons 4 & 5).
 Allison Wilson-Forbes as Nurse Alice: A nurse who works in the ER.
 Jarod Joseph as Dr. Emanuel Palmer: A young interventional radiologist with a unique prospective and a laissez-faire attitude (season 5).
 Greg Calderone as Dr. Billy Scott: A new transfer intern and Dev's former med school rival (season 5).
 Christopher Jacot as Jonathan: Shahir's boyfriend (season 5).

Overview

The series premiered on June 7, 2012 on both CTV in Canada and NBC in the United States. On July 25, 2012, CTV ordered a second, 13 episode season for the summer of 2013. NBC, however, pulled the show's final two episodes from its broadcast schedule and made them available on their official website. On November 16, 2012, CTV announced they had increased their episode order for season 2 to eighteen episodes. On November 7, 2013, CTV ordered a third season of Saving Hope that consisted of eighteen episodes and aired in 2014. On November 10, 2014, CTV ordered a fourth season of Saving Hope that consisted of eighteen episodes, and premiered on September 24. 2015. On December 17, 2015, CTV ordered a fifth and final season of Saving Hope that consisted of 18 episodes.

In 2014, Ion Television announced that they had secured the American broadcast rights to the show.

Home Media

Production

Conception
Malcolm MacRury and Morwyn Brebner devised the concept of the series. MacRury had previously co-created the comedy series Republic of Doyle for CBC, while Brebner had previously co-created television drama Rookie Blue for the Global Television Network. Canadian broadcaster CTV had picked up the pilot episode in November 2011. Executive producers of the show went to Los Angeles, California, to pitch the series to U.S. broadcasters. Their efforts convinced NBC to pick up the series for airing in the United States. CTV and NBC ordered 13 episodes for the first season.

The Los Angeles Times claimed that MacRury and Brebner are trying to "combine a doctors-in-love medical soap opera modeled on Grey's Anatomy with something completely different, a paranormal ghost story with elements of A Gifted Man and Ghost Whisperer. Principal photography for the pilot episode took place in Toronto, Ontario in the spring of 2011.

Reception

Ratings
In Canada, the premiere figures were the highest recorded for the summer season in 2012. The American premiere attracted 3.1 million viewers on NBC, which some critics were unimpressed with.

Reviews
Saving Hope received mixed reviews on Metacritic with a score of 49 out of 100 based on 15 critics' reviews. Verne Gay of Newsday stated the series "is modeled out of particularly sturdy, comfortable and reliable material." He added that it is "a sober, intelligent, placidly paced drama as only the Canadians can make." The Chicago Sun-Timess Lori Rackl said the series "has some fun, clever and emotion-stirring moments, but they’re handicapped by cheesy montages and one too many scenarios designed to remind us of the importance of having hope." Alan Sepinwall of HitFix called Charlie Harris' "spirit walk" around the hospital "an interesting solution to the problem of telling stories we've seen a million times before. But doing it this way ultimately does more harm than good." He added: "It's not bad so much as tired." The San Francisco Chronicles David Wiegand called the series "a lukewarm stew of ideas from other shows... and films... with stock characters and situations that occasionally jerk a demi-tear or two, but with absolutely no authenticity. The sloppy sentimentality is cheap and unearned."

Broadcast
In September 2014, the U.S. television network Ion Television announced a partnership with eOne to have exclusive broadcast rights for current and future American television seasons. In Australia, the series premiered on SoHo on February 6, 2015. The series will began airing reruns on G4, which will relaunch in the Summer of 2021.

See also 
 
 
 List of ghost films
 A Gifted Man

References

External links
  at CTV
 
 Saving Hope at TV Guide

2012 Canadian television series debuts
2017 Canadian television series endings
2010s Canadian drama television series
2010s Canadian LGBT-related drama television series
2010s Canadian medical television series
English-language television shows
Ghosts in television
Television shows filmed in Toronto
Television series by Bell Media
Television series by Entertainment One
Television shows set in Toronto
CTV Television Network original programming